Pokrovka is a rural locality (a village) in Chernushinsky District, Perm Krai, Russia. The population was 40 as of 2010. There is 1 street.

Geography 
Pokrovka is located 36 km southeast of Chernushka (the district's administrative centre) by road. Yesaul is the nearest rural locality.

References 

Rural localities in Chernushinsky District